Banafsheh Deh is a village in Birun Bashm Rural District, Marzan Abad District, Chalus County, Mazandaran Province, Iran. At the 2011 census, its population was 130, in 45 families.

References 

Populated places in Chalus County